was a Japanese music composer. His another name was Tsukimi Satoichita. Kaburagi is best known as a composer of hit song Ginza no Koi no Monogatari which was sung by Yūjirō Ishihara and Junko Makimura.

Selected works

Film scores

 Red Quay (1958)
 Invasion of the Neptune Men (1961)
 Akumyō Series (1962-69)
 The Orphan Brothers (1961)
 Kunoichi ninpō (1964)
 Kenju burai-chō Nagaremono no Mure (1965)
 Tokyo Drifter (1966)
 Tokyo Drifter 2: The Sea is Bright Red as the Color of Love (1966)
 The Singing Gunman (1967)
 A Certain Killer (1967)
 Blackmail Is My Life (1968)
 Curse of the Blood (1968)
 Higashi Shinakai (1968)
 Zatoichi and the Fugitives (1968)
 The Yoshiwara Story (1968)
 Retaliation (1968)
 Daimon Otokode Shinitai (1969)
 Black Rose Mansion (1969)
 Horrors of Malformed Men (1969)
 Stray Cat Rock: Sex Hunter (1970)
 Earth Ninja Chronicles: Duel in the Wind (1970)
 Onna-rō Hizu (1970)
 Blind Woman's Curse (1970)
 Harenchi Gakuen (1970)
 The Masseur's Curse (1970)
 The Insatiable (1971)
 Castle Orgies (1971)
 A Man′s World (1971)
 Naked Seven (1972)
 Beads from a Petal (1972)
 Female Prisoner Scorpion: 701's Grudge Song (1973)
 Bohachi Bushido: Code of the Forgotten Eight (1973)
 Female Yakuza Tale: Inquisition and Torture (1973)
 Hissatsu Shikakenin (1973)
 Hissatsu Shikakenin Baian Arijigoku (1973)
 Female Ninja Magic: 100 Trampled Flowers (1974)
 Executioner (1974)
 THE EXPLOSION (1975)
 Lady Moonflower (1976)
 Assault! Jack the Ripper (1976)
 Karate from Shaolin Temple aka Shorinji Kempo: Musashi Hong Kong ni arawaru (1976)
 Fairy in a Cage (1977)
 KochiKame: Tokyo Beat Cops Movie (1977)
 Karate for Life (1977)
 Rope and Skin (1979)
 Nihon no Fixer (1979)
 The Street of Desire (1984)

Television
 Doberman Deka (1980)
 Edigawa Ranpo no Bijo series aka Akeichi Kogorō series (1977-94)

Vocal
 Ginza no Koi no Monogatari (Yūjirō Ishihara and Junko Makimura)
 Akai Hatoba (Yūjirō Ishihara)
 Akumyō (Shintarō Katsu)
 Tabi Garasu (Akira Kobayashi)
 Otoko no Okite (Tetsuya Watari)
 Nosappu  no Jyu (Joe Shishido)
 Kurashi no Kawa (Yūzō Kayama)
 Umie Kaero (Saburō Kitajima)
 Irodoru Ai (Komaki Kurihara)

References

External links
 
 Hajime Kaburagi Film List at Kinenote

1926 births
2014 deaths
20th-century Japanese composers
21st-century Japanese composers
Japanese film score composers
Japanese male film score composers